Kasu (Telugu: కాసు) is an Indian name, and may refer to:
 Kasu Brahmananda Reddy, former Chief Minister of Andhra Pradesh
 Kasu Krishna Reddy, minister in Andhra Pradesh
 Kasu Brahmananda Reddy National Park, national park in Hyderabad

See also
KASU, radio station in Arkansas
Tonderai Kasu, Zimbabwean politician

Indian surnames